The Holland-Thompson Property, at 1605 CO 133 in Carbondale, Colorado, was listed on the National Register of Historic Places in 2013.  The listing included two contributing buildings, four contributing structures, and three contributing sites.

The Thompson House, a brick Queen Anne-style house on the property, was built in several stages from 1886 to 1910.

References

National Register of Historic Places in Garfield County, Colorado
Queen Anne architecture in Colorado
Buildings and structures completed in 1900